The Journal of Psychology & Theology (JPT) is a peer-reviewed academic journal published by Biola University's Rosemead School of Psychology and has been operating continuously since 1973. JPT is a quarterly journal publishing original research on the integration of psychology and Christian theology.  Empirical studies and theoretical pieces investigating the interrelationships between psychological (e.g., clinical, experimental, industrial/organizational, social, theoretical) and theological topics of study are considered.  Scholarship that explores the application of these interrelationships in a variety of contexts (e.g., mental health counseling, education and training, organizational leadership, churches and other Christian ministry contexts) and/or from an intercultural perspective are encouraged.

References

External links 
 

Religion and science
Protestant studies journals
Psychology of religion journals
Publications established in 1973
Biola University
SAGE Publishing academic journals
Hijacked journals